The Supreme Court of Appeal (SCA), formerly known as the Appellate Division, is the second-highest court of appeal in South Africa below the Constitutional Court. The country's apex court from 1910 to 1994, it no longer holds that position, having been displaced in constitutional matters by the Constitutional Court in 1994, and in all matters by 2013. It is located in Bloemfontein. Bloemfontein is often, and has been traditionally referred to, as the "judicial capital" of South Africa because of the court, although the Constitutional Court is based in Johannesburg.

History
On the creation of the Union of South Africa from four British colonies in 1910, the supreme courts of the colonies became provincial divisions of the new Supreme Court of South Africa, and the Appellate Division was created as a purely appellate court superior to the provincial divisions. It was the seat of some of the country's most outstanding judges including Innes CJ, Watermeyer CJ, Galgut JA, Wessels CJ and Schreiner JA.

In 1994 the Constitutional Court of South Africa was created with jurisdiction superior to the Appellate Division, but it could hear only in constitutional matters. The Appellate Division, therefore, remained the highest court in non-constitutional matters. In 1997 the Appellate Division became the Supreme Court of Appeal and was given constitutional jurisdiction, though the system of two apex courts remained: the Constitutional Court was the country's highest court in constitutional matters, but the SCA was the highest court in non-constitutional matters. However, the Constitutional Court took a broad reading of its jurisdiction, and in August 2013 the position was regularised by an amendment to the South African Constitution which gave the Constitutional Court general jurisdiction.

Judges
The court is composed of a President, a Deputy President, and the number of ordinary Judges of Appeal determined in terms of an Act of Parliament; at present there are 23 ordinary positions on the court . Cases before the court are generally heard by panels of five judges.

Judges are appointed by the President of South Africa on the advice of the Judicial Service Commission. Judges of Appeal are cited in judgments with the surname of the judge followed by "JA". (The President and Deputy President are cited with a "P" and "DP" respectively, and acting judges are cited with "AJA".)

 the Judges of Appeal are:

 Mandisa Maya (President)
 Xola Petse (Deputy)
 Mahomed Navsa
 Visvanathan Ponnan
 Halima Saldulker
 Boissie Mbha
 Dumisani Zondi
 Nambitha Dambuza
 Christiaan Van Der Merwe
 Baratang Mocumie
 Mahube Molemela
 Tati Makgoka
 Ashton Schippers
 Fikile Mokgohloa
 Clive Plasket
 Daniel Dlodlo
 Caroline Nicholls
 Yvonne Mbatha
 Trevor Gorven
 Zeenat Carelse
 Selewe Peter Billy Mothle
 Wendy Hughes
 Nolwazi Penelope Mabindla-Boqwana
 Malcolm Wallis
 Sharise Weiner (Acting)

List of presidents of the Supreme Court of Appeal

List of deputy presidents of the Supreme Court of Appeal

See also

 Supreme Court of Appeal of South Africa cases

References

External links
Supreme Court of Appeal of South Africa official website
Database of judgments from the Supreme Court of Appeal of South Africa

Courts of South Africa
South Africa
Buildings and structures in Bloemfontein
1910 establishments in South Africa
Courts and tribunals established in 1910

fr:Droit sud-africain#Cour suprême d'appel